Qualification for the 2018 Little League World Series took place in eight United States regions and eight international regions from June through August 2018.

United States

Great Lakes
The tournament took place in Westfield, Indiana from August 5–11.

Mid-Atlantic
The tournament took place in Bristol, Connecticut from August 5–12.

Midwest
The tournament took place in Westfield, Indiana from August 5–11.

Note: North Dakota and South Dakota are organized into a single Little League district.

New England
The tournament took place in Bristol, Connecticut from August 5–12.

Northwest
The tournament took place in San Bernardino, California August 5–11.

Southeast
The tournament took place in Warner Robins, Georgia from August 3–8.

Southwest
The tournament took place in Waco, Texas August 2–8.

West
The tournament took place in San Bernardino, California August 5–11.

International

Asia-Pacific
The tournament took place in Seoul, South Korea from June 30–July 6.

1 Republic of China, commonly known as Taiwan, due to complicated relations with People's Republic of China, is recognized by the name Chinese Taipei by majority of international organizations including Little League Baseball (LLB). For more information, please see Cross-Strait relations.

Australia
The tournament took place in Lismore, New South Wales June 6–11. The top two teams in each pool advanced to the elimination round.

Canada
The tournament took place in Mirabel, Quebec from August 2–11.

Caribbean
The tournament took place in Sabana Grande, Puerto Rico from July 14–20.

Europe and Africa

In an expanded format, 10 countries have automatic berths into the regional tournament based on participation and enrollment figures. A qualifier tournament from additional countries wishing to enter took place from July 12–17. The format of the qualifier tournament is a round robin with an elimination round where the two semifinal winners advanced to the double-elimination regional tournament from July 20–27. Both tournaments took place in Kutno, Poland.

Qualifier tournament

Qualifier Championship between Austria and Belarus was canceled due to inclement weather, as a make up was unnecessary because both teams had already advanced.

Regional tournament

Japan
The tournament took place in Tokyo from July 21–22.

Latin America
The tournament took place in Panama City, Panama from July 21–28.

Mexico
The tournament took place in Monterrey from July 7–13.

References

qualification
2018 in baseball